Erato is a genus of flowering plants belonging to tribe Liabeae of the family Asteraceae. It is found from Costa Rica to Bolivia, with its main centre of diversity in Ecuador.

 Species
 Erato costaricensis E. Moran & V.A.Funk - Costa Rica
 Erato polymnioides DC. - Panamá, Ecuador, Peru, Bolivia
 Erato sodiroi (Hieron.) H.Rob. - Ecuador
 Erato stenolepis (S.F.Blake) H.Rob. - Peru
 Erato vulcanica (Klatt) H.Rob. - Costa Rica, Venezuela, Colombia, Ecuador

References

 
Asteraceae genera